Giorgio des Geneys (Chiomonte, April 29, 1761 – Genoa, January 8, 1839) was an Italian admiral.

Military career 
Giorgio Andrea Agnès des Geneys was the son of Giovanni Agnès des Geneys, baron of Fenile and Mathie and Cristina Boutal, countess of Pinasca. 
He was born in the Upper Susa Valley (Susa Valley).

At the age of 12 he was enlisted as ensign in the Royal Navy of the Kingdom of Sardinia where he distinguished himself for bravery during the fight against pirates in the sea of Sardinia.

Des Geneys is considered the true founder of the Sardinian Navy, the ancestor of the Italian Marina Militare.

1761 births
1839 deaths
Italian military personnel of the Napoleonic Wars
18th-century Italian people
Italian admirals